Forud (also Romanized as Forūd) is a village in Kavar Rural District, in the Central District of Kavar County, Fars Province, Iran. At the 2006 census, its population was 2,201, in 417 families.

References 

Populated places in Kavar County